Supreme Ruler Ultimate is a grand strategy video game developed by BattleGoat Studios. It is the fifth installment in the Supreme Ruler series and was released on October 17, 2014. The game is the sequel to Supreme Ruler 1936. It is essentially a compilation release, streamlining Supreme Ruler 2020, Supreme Ruler Cold War, and Supreme Ruler 1936 into one game, using the same UI as 1936, as well as adding additional features and gameplay.

Gameplay
Supreme Ruler Ultimate generally operates as a real-time strategy game, but the player is able to pause the game and choose the game speed. In the game the player tries to control a country they have chosen.  War is a dominant theme in the game with its military element played in battalion-sized units created by the player during the game. There is also a detailed  economic aspect that records a large variety of statistics including under and over employment and natural resources. AI nations work on the same economy system as the player so for example if no one produces enough oil everybody will suffer.

Players can choose from nearly any existing country as their starting region, and some sandboxes and scenarios feature sub-national divisions to choose from (such as US States or European ethnic regions).

Starting eras of the game sandboxes include:

 1914 - The Great War
 1917 - The Great War
 1936 - The Road to War
 1940 - Europe at War
 1941 - The World at War
 1949 - Cold War
 2017 / 2018 - Trump Rising
 2020 - Divided States
 2020 - Make America Great
 2020 - Shattered World
 2020 - World (Modern World)

Regions are controlled through a number of "cabinet departments" consisting of:

 State Department (Diplomacy)
 Finance (Treasury / Spending)
 Resources (Raw and Finished Goods Production and Markets)
 Research (Technology)
 Defense Production
 Defense Deployment and Orders

Development and Release 
Supreme Ruler Ultimate was developed and published by BattleGoat Studios on Steam.  The game uses the proprietary BattleGoat Game Engine that has been used and updated since the release of the original Supreme Ruler 2010 game in 2005.  The Supreme Ruler games series is a modern update of the original Supreme Ruler game first released for the TRS-80 microcomputer in 1982.  Game developer George Geczy created the original game and has been the technical lead and primary programmer in each of the modern game releases.

Supreme Ruler Ultimate was released to the public on Steam for Windows and Mac OSX on October 17, 2014.

DLC

Reception
In a review of the game at Armchair General (magazine), Robert Mackey wrote that "Overall, the game does fine for what it is designed to do—provide a playable, real-time grand-strategy game covering 150 years or so of modern (and future) history."

Neal Sayatovich at Game Industry News, wrote that "Supreme Ruler Ultimate should be the ultimate go-to wargame on your list."

See also

List of grand strategy video games 
List of BattleGoat Studios games 
List of PC games

References

External links
 Supreme Ruler Ultimate at BattleGoat Studios

2014 video games
Cold War video games
Government simulation video games
Grand strategy video games
Multiplayer and single-player video games
MacOS games
Real-time strategy video games
Video games developed in Canada
Windows games
World War II grand strategy computer games
Supreme Ruler